The International Journal of Hydrogen Energy is a peer-reviewed scientific journal covering all aspects of  hydrogen energy, including hydrogen generation and storage. It is published by Elsevier and is an official journal of the International Association for Hydrogen Energy. Established in 1976, the journal became monthly in 1982, biweekly in 2008, 36/yr in 2013, and weekly in 2015. The editor in chief is Turhan Nejat Veziroğlu (University of Miami).

In 2023, the journal was criticized for rejecting papers that do not cite enough of the journal’s previously published papers.

Abstracting and indexing 
The journal is abstracted and indexed in:

According to the Journal Citation Reports, the journal has a 2021 impact factor of 7.139.

References

External links 
 
 International Association for Hydrogen Energy 

Elsevier academic journals
Energy and fuel journals
English-language journals
Publications established in 1976
Hydrogen economy
Hydrogen technologies
Weekly journals
Academic journals associated with international learned and professional societies